The 2017 Spanish Indoor Athletics Championships was the 53rd edition of the annual indoor track and field competition organised by the Royal Spanish Athletics Federation (RFEA), which serves as the Spanish national indoor championship for the sport. A total of 26 events (divided evenly between the sexes) were contested over two days on 18 and 19 February at the Pista Cubierta de Atletismo Carlos Gil Pérez in Salamanca, Castile y León.

Orlando Ortega equalled the championship record of 7.52 in the semi-finals of the men's 60 metres hurdles.

Results

Men

Women

References

Results
LIII Campeonato de España Absoluto en Pista Cubierta . RFEA. Retrieved 2020-03-10.

External links
Official website for the Royal Spanish Athletics Federation

Spanish Indoor Athletics Championships
Spanish Indoor Athletics Championships
Spanish Indoor Athletics Championships
Spanish Indoor Athletics Championships
Sport in Salamanca
Sports competitions in Castile and León